The 2019–20 season is Reyer Venezia's 148th in existence and the club's 10th consecutive season in the top flight of Italian basketball.

Overview 
Venezia participates to the 2018-19 edition of the Lega Basket Serie A as the defending champions, after having won in the 2018-19 season.

They won the Italian Cup and they managed to qualify to the playoffs of the EuroCup Basketball.

Unfortunately, though, the 2019-20 season was hit by the coronavirus pandemic that compelled the federation to suspend and later cancel the competition without assigning the title to anyone. Virtus Bologna ended the championship in 1st position. Followed also the early termination of the EuroCup season where Bologna had reached the quarter finals and Venezia was the only Italian team at winning something, the Italian Cup.

Kit 
Supplier: Erreà / Sponsor: Umana

Players

Current roster

Depth chart

Squad changes

In

|}

Out

|}

Confirmed 

|}

Coach

Competitions

SuperCup 

Venezia took part in the 25th edition of the Italian Basketball Supercup as the 2019 LBA Finals and Italian Championship winners. They lost in the finals against Dinamo Sassari, team against which Venezia won the championship finals.

Serie A

EuroCup

Regular season

Top 16

Italian Cup 
Venezia qualified to the 2020 Italian Basketball Cup having ended the first half of the season in 8th place. They won the competition for the first time in their history.

References 

2019–20 in Italian basketball by club
2019–20 EuroCup Basketball by club